Secrets on the Way is a 1958 poetry collection by the Swedish writer Tomas Tranströmer.

1958 poetry books
Poetry by Tomas Tranströmer
Swedish poetry collections